Poppy Miller (born 28 February 1969) is an English actress.

Miller was born in Norwich, England. She attended The Hewett School, studied philosophy and English at New Hall College, University of Cambridge and later attended the Webber Douglas Academy of Dramatic Art.

Miller is best known for her role as DC Carol Browning in the British detective series The Commander. Miller has a role in the ITV television movie If I Had You, and also acted in Series 2 of Red Cap.

Miller played Mary Magdalene in The Last Days of Judas Iscariot at the Almeida Theatre. She also appeared on the Nickelodeon show House of Anubis playing Vera Devenish in season 2.

In the BBC's remake of E. F. Benson's Mapp and Lucia (2014) Miller played the Padre's wife, Evie Bartlett, a character from the original books who had not appeared in ITV's 1980s adaptation.

In May 2016, it was announced that Miller had been cast as Ginny Weasley in Harry Potter and the Cursed Child. She reprised her performance on Broadway at the Lyric Theatre in 2018.

Filmography

References

External links

Living people
English film actresses
1969 births
English television actresses
Alumni of the Webber Douglas Academy of Dramatic Art
Actors from Norwich
Alumni of the University of Cambridge
20th-century English actresses
21st-century English actresses
People educated at The Hewett School